The men's 400 metres hurdles was a track & field athletics event at the 1900 Summer Olympics in Paris. This event was held for the first time at the Olympics. The competition took part on July 14 and July 15, 1900. The race was held on a track of 500 metres in circumference. Five athletes from four nations competed in the longest of the three hurdling events. The event was won by Walter Tewksbury of the United States. Henri Tauzin of France earned silver, while George Orton of Canada took bronze.

Background

This was the first time the event was held. Introduced along with the men's 200 metres hurdles, the men's 400 metres hurdles was the only one of the two new hurdles events that would stay on the programme long-term, joining the 110 metres hurdles that had been contested in 1896. The 400 metres version would be held in 1900, 1904, and 1908 before being left off for one Games in 1912; when the Olympics returned after World War I, the men's 400 metres hurdles was back and would continue to be contested at every Games thereafter. 

This was an unfamiliar event to many of the competing nations; it was not held at the AAU or the AAA championships. Only France regularly had competitions of this format; Henri Tauzin was their five-time title-winner.

Bohemia, Canada, France, the United States competed in the inaugural 400 metres hurdles event.

Competition format

The competition consisted of two rounds: semifinals and a final. Withdrawals made the two-round format somewhat overkill; of the 10 men entered, only 5 started the semifinals that were to narrow to the field to 4. Then one of the finalists withdrew as well, leaving only 3 men to race. Most of the hurdles were telephone poles laid across the track; the final hurdle was a water jump.

The semifinal round consisted of two heats, with 3 hurdlers in one and 2 in the other. The top 2 athletes in each semifinal advanced to the final.

Records

These were the standing world and Olympic records (in seconds) prior to the 1900 Summer Olympics.

* unofficial 440 yards (= 402.34 m)

The times set in the two heats are uncertain. In the final Walter Tewksbury set the new Olympic record with 57.6 seconds.

Schedule

Results

Semifinals

In the semifinal round, there were two heats run on July 14. The top two runners in each advanced to the final, meaning that only one athlete was eliminated in the heats.

Semifinal 1

Tewksbury won from Lewis by ten yards (~9 m). This meant that Nedvěd, placing third, was the only athlete eliminated in the round.

Semifinal 2

With only two athletes in the heat and both to qualify, neither hurdler ran anywhere near full speed. Tauzin beat Orton by three inches (8 cm).

Final

Lewis withdrew as the final was held on a Sunday. For the three who did start, it was the first race of the event that posed any sort of challenge, with hurdles fashioned out of 30-foot (9 m) long telegraph poles and a 16-foot (5 m) water jump on the final straight; Tewksbury still did not have much difficulty, leading from the start to win by about five yards (4.5 m), with Orton a further four yards (3.5 m) back.

Results summary

References

Sources
 International Olympic Committee.
 De Wael, Herman. Herman's Full Olympians: "Athletics 1900". Accessed 18 March 2006.
 

Men's hurdles 400 metres
400 metres hurdles at the Olympics